Jack Hyde (18 May 1899 – 1982) was an English footballer who played two games in the Football League for Port Vale in 1924.

Career
Hyde joined Port Vale as an amateur in July 1924 and made his Second Division debut at The Old Recreation Ground in a 4–0 victory over Coventry City on 25 October. After missing the next game, he played in a 1–0 home win over Sheffield Wednesday two weeks after his debut, but was not selected again and was probably released at the end of the 1924–25 season.

Career statistics
Source:

References

1899 births
1982 deaths
Sportspeople from Leek, Staffordshire
English footballers
Association football midfielders
Port Vale F.C. players
English Football League players